Meekins is a surname. Notable people with the surname include:

Drew Meekins (born 1985), American pair skater and choreographer
Isaac Melson Meekins (1875–1946), American judge
Marlo Meekins, American cartoonist
Russ Meekins Sr. (1915–1995), American politician
Russ Meekins Jr. (1949–2020), American politician